Wherwell Wood is a hamlet in the civil parish of Wherwell in the Test Valley district of Hampshire, England. It lies approximately 2.7 miles (4.4 km) south from Andover, its nearest town. The hamlet is named after Wherwell Wood, a large wood containing  of woodland and plantations.

References

Villages in Hampshire